Mittraphap highway may refer to one of two highways in Thailand
 Thailand Route 2, commonly known as Mittraphap Road
 Thailand Route 12 between Phitsanulok and Lom Sak